Markha (Marxa örüs) is a river in the Sakha Republic in Russia. It is a left tributary of the Vilyuy (in the drainage basin of the Lena).

Course
The river has its sources on the Vilyuy Plateau, a part of the Central Siberian Plateau.
It joins the left bank of the Vilyuy  from its mouth.

See also
List of rivers of Russia

References

External links

Rivers of the Sakha Republic